"Parempi mies" is a song by Finnish rapper Cheek featuring Samuli Edelmann. The song was released as a promotional single from Cheek's tenth studio album Kuka muu muka. The single and the accompanying music video, directed by Hannu Aukia, were released in October 2013. "Parempi mies" peaked at number six on the Finnish Singles Chart.

Charts

References

2013 songs
Cheek (rapper) songs
Finnish-language songs
Songs written by William Bell (singer)
Songs written by Booker T. Jones